This is a list of national parks of Ireland.

The chart below shows the national parks in Ireland. The first park established in Ireland was Killarney National Park located in County Kerry in 1932. Since then a further five national parks have been opened; the most recent being Ballycroy in County Mayo. They cover  in total, 0.9% of the land area of the country.

See also
Conservation in the Republic of Ireland
National parks of Northern Ireland (none as of 2020)
List of nature reserves in the Republic of Ireland
List of Special Areas of Conservation in the Republic of Ireland

References

External links
Official website

Ireland
 
National parks
National parks